Anthony Benjamin Beltran (born October 11, 1987) is an American former soccer player who spent nearly all of his entire professional career at Real Salt Lake.

Career

Youth career
Beltran was a two-time Parade All American at Claremont High School. He was also named in the 2004 NSCAA/Adidas High School All-America squad and was a member of the Region IV Olympic Development Program from 2002 to 2005 and captain of the 2004 squad.

College
Tony Beltran began college playing as forward for St. John's Red Storm playing 21 matches with 10 starts, scoring 2 goals and three assists. For his Sophomore year he transferred to UCLA to play for UCLA Bruins. In his Sophomore year he overcame an early season ankle injury to make 14 appearances He played for two years at UCLA and started all 21 matches of his Junior year and played all but four minutes of the season as right full back and defensive midfielder.

Professional
Tony Beltran was selected third in the overall 2008 MLS SuperDraft and made his official Major League Soccer debut on April 12, 2008 against D.C. United. He started 10 of his 15 appearances in his rookie year.

Due to chronic knee issues, Beltran announced his retirement from professional soccer on September 13, 2019.

International
Beltran was born in the United States and is of Mexican descent. Beltran was the starter for the U-18 team that won the 2005 Milk Cup, started in all five matches in the 2007 FIFA U-20 World Cup with the USMNT progressing to quarter finals. He also made two appearances for the U-23 team in the 2008 Toulon Tournament. He was named to the January 2013 training camp for the USA national team and made his debut in a 0–0 friendly against Canada at BBVA Compass Stadium.

Career statistics

Club

International

Honors

References

External links

Tony Beltran UCLA Bruins

1987 births
Living people
American soccer players
American sportspeople of Mexican descent
St. John's Red Storm men's soccer players
UCLA Bruins men's soccer players
LA Laguna FC players
People from Claremont, California
Real Salt Lake players
Real Monarchs players
Soccer players from California
Major League Soccer players
USL Championship players
Major League Soccer All-Stars
Real Salt Lake draft picks
United States men's under-20 international soccer players
United States men's under-23 international soccer players
United States men's international soccer players
USL League Two players
2013 CONCACAF Gold Cup players
CONCACAF Gold Cup-winning players
Association football defenders